The Senedo were a Native American tribe who inhabited an area along the north fork of the Shenandoah River in what is present-day northern Virginia. They may have been an Iroquoian tribe; most of the Iroquoian peoples were located further north around the Great Lakes.

Other Iroquoian-speaking tribes in what is present-day Virginia were the Nottoway and Meherrin. The much larger Cherokee people, historically located further west and south in the Carolinas, Tennessee, and Deep South, still speak their Iroquoian language.

Early English colonial records noted encounters with a few men who said they were survivors of a massacre of the Senedo, committed by the powerful Catawba, their traditional enemy, between 1650 and 1700. Based in the Carolina Piedmont, the Catawba were a Siouan-speaking people and had a different culture. They competed over the fur trade, game, and other resources.

In 1778, during the American Revolutionary War, rebels named Shenandoah County after the former native people of the area. The county had formerly been named for the Royal Governor Lord Dunmore.

References

Native American tribes in Virginia
Shenandoah County, Virginia